

Births and deaths

Births
 John Doherty (1900–1980)
 Johnny Doran (1907–1950)
 Seamus Ennis (1919–1982)
 Felix Doran (c. 1915–1972)
 Margaret Barry (1917– c. 1989 or 1990)
 Willie Clancy (1918–1973)
 Joe Heaney (1919–1984)
 Joe Cooley (1924–1973)
 Andy Irvine (1942)
 Christy Moore (1945)
 Van Morrison (1945)
 Matt Molloy (1947)
 John O'Conor (1947)
 Davy Spillane (1948)
 Gilbert O'Sullivan (1946)

Deaths
 John J Kimmel (1866–1942)
 Michael Coleman (1891–1945)

Collections of songs or music
 1907 "The Dance Music Of Ireland" by Francis O'Neill (1848–1936)
 1909 Old Irish Folk Music by Patrick Weston Joyce (1827–1949

Recordings
 1907–1929 "Early Recordings of Irish Traditional Music" by John J Kimmel
 1936 Michael Coleman's final recordings
 1937–1939 "Classic Recordings of Irish Traditional Music" by Hugh Gillespie
 1920s–1944 "Classics of Irish Piping" by Leo Rowsome (1907–1970)
 1947 "The Bunch of Keys" by Johnny Doran (1907–1950)

See also
List of Irish music collectors

1900